Dima Aktaa (born 1994) is a Syrian athlete and fundraiser, who was named one the BBC's 100 Women list in 2022. As of 2022 Aktaa was in training to compete in the 100m at the 2024 Summer Paralympics.

Biography 
Aktaa was born in 1994 in Syria. In August 2012 her home in Salqin, near Idlib, was bombed and her leg was removed in the subsequent explosion. The family left Syria for Lebanon, where they lived for a number of years, before coming the United Kingdom as refugees in 2017. She and her family were settled in Bedfordshire in 2018.

During the COVID-19 pandemic she was part of a walking initiative that raised over £70,000 to support vaccination schemes in refugee camps. As of 2022 Aktaa was in training to compete in the 100m at the 2024 Summer Paralympics.

Recognition 
Aktaa's contributions to sport and disability awareness were recognised by her inclusion on the BBC's 100 Women list in 2022. In 2020 she was recognised as a member of 'The Lionhearts' - an alternative England football squad. The pop singer Anne-Marie wrote a song about her life.

References

External links 

 The Guilty Feminist: Being Extra with Felicity Ward and special guests Sol Escobar and Dema Aktaa (podcast)
 Anne-Marie - Beautiful [Official Video]
 Dima Aktaa - Instagram

1994 births
Living people
Syrian women activists
Syrian sportspeople
Refugees
Syrian refugees
Refugees in the United Kingdom
Refugees of the Syrian civil war
BBC 100 Women